The Captain of Nakara is a 2012 Kenyan comedy film. It is an adaption of the German play The Captain of Köpenick by Carl Zuckmayer, itself based on the life story of Wilhelm Voigt, a small-time criminal who posed as a Hauptmann (Captain) in Berlin in 1906.

Plot
The small-time thug Muntu (Bernard Safari) has just been released from prison in the fictional African country of Nakara. Shortly after, he falls in love with a preacher's daughter, and loath to tell her of his dark past he pretends to be a successful businessman. From there the lie spins into him taking on the guise of the military captain Nakara, leading to changes not only for him, but also for the whole nation.

Cast
Bernard Safari as Muntu
Shirlen Wanjari as Muna
Charles Kiarie as Sunday
Charles Bukeko as General Lumumba
Patrick Oketch as Captain
Joel Otukho as Ballad Monger
Lucy Wangui Gichomo as Civil Servant
Ephraim Muriithi as Fence
Evans Muthini as Jailor
Anne Njathi as Waguyu
Veronica Waceke as Shop Assistant
Jim Were as Kiosk Owner
Joseph Olita (uncredited) as Muntu's father-in-law

References

External links
 
 

Swahili-language films
2012 films
2012 comedy films
Kenyan comedy films
English-language Kenyan films
2010s English-language films